The following is a list of coaches, including role(s) and year(s) of service, for the Detroit Tigers franchise.

Bench Coach 
 Ed Brinkman: 1979
 Billy Consolo: 1979–1992
 Glenn Ezell: 1996
 Larry Parrish: 1997–1998
 Bob Melvin: 2000
 Doug Mansolino: 2001
 Felipe Alou: 2002
 Luis Pujols: 2002
 Kirk Gibson: 2003–2005
 Gene Lamont: 2013–2017
 Steve Liddle: 2018–2019
 Lloyd McClendon: 2020
 George Lombard: 2021–2023

Hitting Coach 
 Billy Hitchcock: 1957
 Gates Brown: 1978–1984
 Vada Pinson: 1985–1991
 Larry Herndon: 1992–1998
 Toby Harrah: 1998
 Alan Trammell: 1999
 Bill Madlock: 2000–2001
 Merv Rettenmund: 2002
 Bruce Fields: 2003–2005
 Don Slaught: 2006
 Lloyd McClendon: 2007–2013
 Wally Joyner: 2014–2016
 Lloyd McClendon: 2017–2019
 Joe Vavra: 2020
 Scott Coolbaugh: 2021–2022
 Keith Beauregard: 2023
 Michael Brdar: 2023

Pitching Coach 
 Willis Hudlin: 1957–1959
 Tom Ferrick: 1960–1963
 Stubby Overmire: 1963–1966
 Johnny Sain: 1967–1969
 Ted Kazanski: 1969
 Mike Roarke: 1970
 Art Fowler: 1971–1973
 Cot Deal: 1973–1974
 Steve Hamilton: 1975
 Fred Gladding: 1976–1978
 Johnny Grodzicki: 1979
 Roger Craig: 1980–1984
 Billy Muffett: 1985–1994
 Ralph Treuel: 1995
 Jon Matlack: 1996
 Rick Adair: 1996–1999
 Dan Warthen: 1999–2002
 Steve McCatty: 2002
 Bob Cluck: 2003–2005
 Chuck Hernandez: 2006–2008
 Rick Knapp: 2009–2011
 Jeff Jones: 2011–2015
 Rich Dubee: 2016–2017
 Chris Bosio: 2018 – June 26, 2018
 Rick Anderson: June 27, 2018 – 2020
 Chris Fetter: 2021–2023

First Base Coach 
 Schoolboy Rowe: 1954–1955
 Don Lund: 1957
 Tommy Henrich: 1958–1959
 Luke Appling: 1960
 Don Heffner: 1961
 Phil Cavarretta: 1962–1963
 Pat Mullin: 1963–1966
 Wally Moses: 1967–1970
 Frank Skaff: 1971:
 Dick Tracewski: 1972–1978
 Gates Brown: 1979
 Dick Tracewski: 1980–1991
 Gene Roof: 1992–1995
 Ron Oester: 1996
 Jerry White: 1997–1998
 Juan Samuel: 1999–2002
 Rafael Landestoy: 2002
 Mick Kelleher: 2003–2005
 Andy Van Slyke: 2006–2009
 Tom Brookens: 2010–2012
 Rafael Belliard: 2013
 Omar Vizquel: 2014–2017
 Ramón Santiago: 2018–2019
 Dave Clark: 2020
 Ramón Santiago: 2021 – July 16, 2021
 Kimera Bartee: July 17, 2021 – December 20, 2021
 Gary Jones: 2022

Third Base Coach 
 Billy Hitchcock: 1955–1960
 Phil Cavarretta: 1961
 George Myatt: 1962–1963
 Bob Swift: 1963–1966
 Frank Skaff: 1966
 Tony Cuccinello: 1967–1968
 Grover Resinger: 1969–1970
 Joe Schultz Jr.: 1971–1976
 Fred Hatfield: 1977–1978
 Dick Tracewski: 1979
 Alex Grammas: 1980–1991
 Dick Tracewski: 1992–1995
 Terry Francona: 1996
 Perry Hill: 1997–1999
 Doug Mansolino: 2000
 Lance Parrish: 2001
 Doug Mansolino: 2002
 Juan Samuel: 2002–2005
 Gene Lamont: 2006–2012
 Tom Brookens: 2013
 Dave Clark: 2014–2019
 Ramón Santiago: 2020
 Chip Hale: 2021 – July 5, 2021
 Ramón Santiago: July 17, 2021 – 2022

Bullpen Coach 
 Mike Roarke: 1965–1966
 Hal Naragon: 1967–1969
 Len Okrie: 1970
 Charlie Silvera: 1971–1973
 Jim Hegan: 1974–1978
 Dan Whitmer: 1992–1994
 Jeff Jones: 1995
 Fred Kendall: 1996–1998
 Jeff Jones: 1999–2000
 Ed Ott: 2001–2002
 Jeff Jones: 2002
 Lance Parrish: 2003–2005
 Lloyd McClendon: 2006
 Jeff Jones: 2007–2011
 Mike Rojas: 2011–2013
 Mick Billmeyer: 2014–2017
 Rick Anderson: 2018 – June 26, 2018
 A. J. Sager: June 27, 2018 – 2019
 Jeff Pico: 2019–2020

Others 
 Rafael Belliard: 2006–2009 (infield coach)
 Darnell Coles: 2014 (assistant hitting coach)
 David Newhan: 2015–2016 (assistant hitting coach)
 Leon Durham: 2017 (assistant hitting coach)
 Omar Vizquel: 2017 (infield/base running coach)
 Phil Clark: 2018–2020 (assistant hitting coach)
 Joe Vavra: 2018–2019 (quality control coach)
 Josh Paul: 2020–2021 (quality control coach)
 Juan Nieves: 2021–2022 (assistant pitching coach)
 José Cruz Jr.: 2021 (assistant hitting coach)
 Mike Hessman: 2021–2022 (assistant hitting coach)
 Robin Lund: 2023 (assistant pitching coach)
 James Rowson: 2023 (assistant hitting coach)

References

Detroit Tigers coaches
coaches
Detroit Tigers